Ohmatazawa Dam  is a gravity dam located in Kanagawa Prefecture in Japan. The dam is used for power production. The catchment area of the dam is 16 km2. The dam impounds about 2  ha of land when full and can store 90 thousand cubic meters of water. The construction of the dam was started on 1914 and completed in 1917.

See also
List of dams in Japan

References

Dams in Kanagawa Prefecture